Nong Faek is a tambon (subdistrict) of Saraphi District, in Chiang Mai Province, Thailand. In 2020 it had a total population of 5,957 people.

Administration

Central administration
The tambon is subdivided into 9 administrative villages (muban).

Local administration
The whole area of the subdistrict is covered by the subdistrict municipality (Thesaban Tambon) Nong Faek (เทศบาลตำบลหนองแฝก).

References

External links
Thaitambon.com on Nong Faek

Tambon of Chiang Mai province
Populated places in Chiang Mai province